BeyWheelz is an anime series, a spin-off of the series Beyblade. While produced in Japan, the series has yet to be aired in Japanese. Originally commissioned by Nelvana to make up for Beyblade: Metal Fury's shortened season, BeyWheelz is a series of 13 episodes, which is set in an independent continuity. The series is followed by BeyWarriors: BeyRaiderz, which acts as a continuation story for Sho, Jin, and Leon.

Plot
The series follows Team Estrella, a group of young and talented Beywheelers residing at Destection City.  The peace of that place is threatened when a group of aggressive wheelers calling themselves Dominators attempts to take over the Beywheelz world. Unable to accept such a reign of terror, Team Estrella opposes the Dominators and ends up fighting them in the Judgement Bey tournament, which is to decide the fate of the world they live in, as well as the fate of an unknown, undiscovered one.

Characters

Main characters
Sho Tenma is the protagonist of the show and a light-hearted and friendly person and the leader of Team Estrella. Sho always looks at the bright side and might appear a little carefree, but in battles his true, seemingly endless potential comes to the surface. Sho is renowned as the BeyWheelz World Champion. He is voiced by Christopher Jacot and Kaito Ishikawa.
Jin Ryu is Sho's best friend and one of the founding members of Team Estrella. He is a silent and level-headed character who has a strong sense of sportsmanship. He takes everything very seriously and functions as a voice of reason for his friends. He is voiced by Austin Di Iulio.
Leon Fierce is the last founding member of Team Estrella. He appears rough and a little rude, but once you get to know him he turns out to be a very caring person. Leon has a bad temper that tends to get his way, but despite that and his unique way of treating others he is also a good mentor. He is voiced by Zachary Bennett.
Covey Horn used to be known as the Strong Armed Outlaw, who battled any opponent mercilessly. Due to the kind influence of a boy called Antonio he changed and became a much kinder person. Covey is strong and honest, but he can be a bit naive. He strongly admires Leon and follows him around everywhere. He is voiced by Scott Beaudin. 
Marche Ovis is a computer genius and a very analytic person. With his computer, he can perform in-depth analysis on beybattles. He is close friends with Nicole, even though he is often exasperated by her straightforward nature. They build a tag team. He is also called the racing cpu. He is voiced by Krystal Meadows. 
Nicole Spears is an out-going and very self-confident girl. She doesn't hesitate to say what she thinks and is never one to shy down from a challenge. While at first she preferred to work alone, she now is a team with her friend Marche. Yet she often acts disapproving of over-analyzing and prefers taking impulsive action by far. She is voiced by Ashley Botting.

Supporting characters
Ryan Glastone is the true leader of the Dominators and the chairman of the wheeling support organisation DREAM. An accident in his past prevents him from wheeling again, which is why he created to Judgement Bey to find a strong replacement. It was him who made Beywheelz as popular as it is by the time of the plot. He is obsessed by the idf going to the New World and ruling over it as well. Ryan is a twisted character, who cannot understand the ideals of friendship and fighting spirit or even the feelings of other people. He seems to find genuine amusement in whatever he does. He is voiced by Andrew Sabiston.
Odin is the leader of the Dominators. He is silent and unwilling to get closer to anybody. Filling the 'emptiness in his heart' is his highest priority. After he battles Sho, he finds his wish fulfilled and decides to try to make friends by joining Team Estrella in the final battle. He is voiced by Jonathan Wilson.
Glen is the Number 2 of the Dominators and a hot-headed, merciless fighter. The thing he cares most about is strength. He is ruthless and really likes fire. He is voiced by Jason Deline.
Jake may appear like a playful individualist who can't get serious, but in truth he is a real sadist. Most often he is seen smiling and joking, but more than anything he enjoys seeing other people suffer. Jake is extremely expressive and talkative. He is voiced by Will Bowes.
Sting is a rather mysterious Wheeler who rarely talks outside of battles. He's known for using unfair tactics. In fights, he is prone to cruelty. After being punished for losing in Judgement Bey his mental instability increases greatly. He is voiced by Kris Ferguson. 
David is Gigante's older brother and a very withdrawn person. He seems to be annoyed with everything happening around him and only becomes expressive when he is in a fight. While he once truly cared for his brother, David has become damaged by the hard Dominator training. Nowadays he only cares about becoming the strongest. While he realizes the inhumanity of his team, even against its own members, he sees no other way for himself than to remain a part of it. He is voiced by Lou Attia. 
Gigante is David's younger brother and on first sight he appears very intimidating. However, he is not as corrupted as his teammates and in truth all he dreams of is having fun together with his brother. David's personality change hurts him, but Gigante has not given up on a better future for the two of them. In the final battle, he rejoins Team Estrella and presumed to be reconciled with his older brother in the aftermath. He is voiced by Cle Bennett.  
Mathew Kendrick is a mysterious person who works as Ryan's secretary. He has trained the Dominators personally and is very devoted to Ryan's ideals. He is voiced by Julian DeZotti. 
Lucy McClain is Ryan's other secretary and just as mysterious as her partner. In her civilian role she always appears composed and matter-of-factly but as Matthew, she shows a more aggressively strict and conceited side. She, too, has trained the Dominators. She is voiced by Linda Ballantyne.
DJ is the announcer of Destection City, who will come to any battle held in the area and comment in his cheery and lively style. He is voiced by Brian West. 
Ken  is a local BeyWheelz fighter that wants to join Team Estrella. He's one of the first individuals to be attacked by The Dominators. He is voiced by Nathaniel Stephenson. 
George is another local BeyWheelz fighter that is friends with Ken and gets attacked by the Dominators. He is voiced by James Hartnett.  
Tom is the youngest BeyWheelz fighter shown in the series. Since he's just learning how to battle when The Dominators attack, he is sent to get Team Estrella to ask for their help. He is voiced by Cory Doran.
Ringside is the Das Vegas equivalent to the DJ, who comments on the BeyWheelz Grand Prix. He is voiced by Milton Barnes.
Narrator opens each episode by telling the history of how BeyWheelz were created. He is voiced by Garth Naumoff.

Episode list

Toys

Within the series
BeyWheelz were said to be formed from a star fragment, just like its predecessor, Beyblade: Metal Fury. A BeyWheel is just like a Beyblade, only the toy has a slightly thicker outermost wheel and it is made to spin on its side. In the anime series there are three types of battling. One type is a Crash Battle. Two players battle in a head-to-head match and one person is the victor. Another type is a Race Battle. Two tops engage in a race to see who is the fastest. The last type is a Stunt Battle. Players see who will win by tops clashing with no mercy and only one will be left standing.

In real life
In May 2012, Hasbro displayed the BeyWheelz toy line at the American International Toy Fair in New York City. You have a launcher and a Beywheelz to fight and race other people. There are four parts of a Beywheelz, a spirit axle, a spirit shield, an energy core and an attack gear.

References

External links

Animated television series about children
Beyblade
Japanese children's animated action television series
Japanese children's animated science fantasy television series
Japanese children's animated sports television series
TV Tokyo original programming
YTV (Canadian TV channel) original programming